Beard, Wives, Denim is the fourth album by Australian psychedelic rock band Pond, released by Modular Recordings on 2 March 2012 in Australia. Most of the recording was done over two weeks at Zampatti Farm, Eagle Bay, Western Australia in 2010, which is pictured on the album cover.

Background
While it's the fourth album released overall by Pond, Beard, Wives, Denim was released to more critical acclaim and received more mainstream attention than past efforts. Earlier albums featured a more experimental sound and improvisational aspect to them, whereas Beard, Wives, Denim honed in on more typical rock music structure, albeit with mid-song jams remaining intact.

Track listing

Personnel
 Nick "Paisley Adams" Allbrook – vocals, flute, keys, guitar, slide guitar, bass & occasional drums
 Jay "Wesley Goldtouch/Wirey B. Buddah" Watson – vocals, guitar, keys, synth, backing vocals & occasional drums
 Joseph "Shoseph Orion McJam" Ryan – vocals, guitar, 12-string guitar, slide guitar, bass & backing vocals
 Jamie Terry – keys, organ & bass
 Kevin "Kaykay Sorbet" Parker – drums
 James SK Wān – bamboo flute

Credits
 Kevin Parker – producer and mastering
 Rob Grant – mixer and mastering
 Sam Ford – engineer

References

2012 albums
Pond (Australian band) albums
Modular Recordings albums
Albums produced by Kevin Parker